Ian Meadows is an Australian actor, playwright and writer.

Early life and education
Born and raised in Collie, Western Australia, Meadows trained at Curtin University and the Western Australian Academy of Performing Arts (WAAPA), graduating in 2005. His older brother Ross Meadows played hockey for Australia and his younger sister Neroli Meadows is a sports journalist on Fox Sports Australia and Fox Footy.

Acting career
Meadows's highest profile television role to date was as Rocco Cooper, a young troubled boy who was forced by his brother to try and take out Sally Fletcher, on the long-running Australian soap opera Home and Away.

Other roles have included a part in The Shark Net, "Elliot" in Tripping Over, a single-episode role as "Jeff Weiss" on All Saints, and a major role in the short films Brothers, Legacy, Water, as well as the 2009 film Mao's Last Dancer and the miniseries The Pacific.  Theatre credits include "Modern International Dead" at the Griffin Theatre Company in Sydney in 2008 for which he earned a nomination for "Best Newcomer" at the Sydney Theatre Awards 2008.

He appeared in the Russian play Ladybird at the Belvoir St Theatre, Sydney in March 2009, which he also helped produce and re-write to localise in Australia. In 2010, he has a recurring role on police series Rush, playing James, the son of Inspector Kerry Vincent (played by Catherine McClements). He also played as Pvt. Cecil Evans on the HBO miniseries The Pacific which was filmed mostly on Australia.

In 2011, Meadows was seen in the ABC telemovie Paper Giants: The Birth of Cleo, playing the role of photographer Andrew Cowell, and was also in season three episode of East West 101, playing Simon. Also in 2011, he reprised his guest starring role of James Vincent on Rush.

Meadows starred in A Moody Christmas, an ABC comedy series which aired on ABC1 in the weeks leading up to Christmas 2012. A follow up series The Moodys aired on ABC1 in early 2014.

During 2016 and 2017, Meadows played a leading role in Network 10's Australian drama series, The Wrong Girl.

Meadows appears as Matt Aldin in the 2021 Netflix drama Clickbait.

Meadows is also a writer, having written episodes for Spirited, SLiDE, Offspring, The Moodys, Playing for Keeps and RFDS. Meadows starred in the Horror drama film Scare Campaign as lead character Marcus.

Awards and nominations

Filmography

Television

Film

Writing and other credits
 Water (2009, short film) – writer
 A Parachute Falling in Siberia (2010, short film) – writer / director
 Spirited (2010–2011, S1E2, S1E4 & S2E9) – writer
 Offspring (2011, S2E5) – writer
 SLiDE (2011, S1E8) – writer
 Four Deaths in the Life of Ronaldo Abok (2011, theatre production) ― writer / co-director
 Between Two Waves (2012, theatre production) – writer
 The Turning (2013, feature film, segment "Defender") – writer (screenplay) / director
 The Moodys (2014, S1E7) – writer
 House Husbands (2017, S3E5 & S3E8) – writer
 Operation: Native (2017, documentary) – self appearance
 The Wrong Girl (2017, S2E3 & S2E8) – writer
 Playing for Keeps (2018, S1E3 & S1E7) – writer
 On the Ropes (2018, miniseries, 4 episodes) – writer
 SeaChange (2019, S4E7) – writer
 RFDS (2021, S1E1, S1E2, S1E5 & S1E6) – writer

Book
 "Between Two Waves", by Ian Meadows. Currency Press, 1 October 2012.

Notes

References

External links

 Ian Meadows on TV.com
Sydney Morning Herald Review of Ian Meadow's "Modern International Dead" performance

Living people
1983 births
Male actors from Western Australia
Australian male stage actors
Australian male film actors
Australian male television actors
Australian male soap opera actors
Australian television writers
Australian male television writers